The 1972–73 Nationalliga A season was the 35th season of the Nationalliga A, the top level of ice hockey in Switzerland. Eight teams participated in the league, and HC La Chaux-de-Fonds won the championship.

Standings

External links
 Championnat de Suisse 1972/73

Swiss
National League (ice hockey) seasons
Nationalliga A season